Nano Babies is a science fiction essay film by Swiss director Thomas Imbach, which he realised in 1998 together with Jürg Hassler. Nano Babies follows everyday life in a crèche at a technical university. Two future-creating worlds - the worlds of the children and their parents - collide. Nano Babies was produced for Swiss television.

Plot 
In the 50-minute film, small children are shown in a day nursery: As in Thomas Imbach's previous film Ghetto, fragments of the children's everyday lives, captured in rich detail, alternate with a variety of (cold, forbidding) exterior views and artful sounds (the day nursery is part of a university and the building also houses the laboratories and offices of the parents, mostly high-tech scientists).

Background 
Imbach and his cinematographer Jürg Hassler call their film, shot in Cinemascope, a "science fiction essay", which, in a thoroughly ironic way, pretty much sums up the cinematic argument of Nano Babies.

References

External links 
 
 Nano Babies bei Swiss Films
 Website von Thomas Imbachs Bachim Film

1998 films
Swiss documentary films
Swiss television films